Waubonsee Community College is a public community college with three campuses in Illinois: Sugar Grove, Aurora, and Plano. Founded in 1966, Waubonsee Community College serves twelve public school districts in Aurora, Batavia, Big Rock, Bristol, Elburn, Geneva, Hinckley, Kaneville, Leland, Maple Park, North Aurora, Plano, Sandwich, Somonauk, Oswego, Sugar Grove, and Yorkville.

Academics 
In addition to its primary campuses, the college also uses facilities in many communities as extension site locations. At these nearly forty sites, Waubonsee provides college credit courses, seminars for business and industry, workshops for personal enrichment, and programs for youth.

Delivery of instruction across the district has also expanded through distance learning and the college's video conferencing system. This system links Waubonsee's three academic sites, two area high schools and the Illinois Mathematics and Science Academy via a two-way interactive microwave network. Using fiber optics, the network also includes Judson University, Kishwaukee College, and McHenry County College, thus enhancing the academic programs offered by Waubonsee and the Fox Valley Educational Alliance (FVEA).

Waubonsee is a founding member of the Illinois Virtual Campus (IVC) and also provides courses to students statewide through Illinois Community Colleges Online (ILCCO). Waubonsee has the distinction of being an ILCCO grant recipient naming Waubonsee as the host institution and college responsible for the development and operation of the ILCCO Learning Academy. The Learning Academy provides training and support for Illinois community college educators in the development, design and delivery of online courses. Waubonsee offers more than 100 online courses and is one of a handful of higher education institutions in Illinois to offer fully accredited degrees to students in a distance learning format.

Athletics
The nickname for the athletic department is the Chiefs.
First year for the Chiefs athletics was 1967-68.

References

External links

1966 establishments in Illinois
Community colleges in Illinois
Education in Aurora, Illinois
Education in Kane County, Illinois
Education in Kendall County, Illinois
Educational institutions established in 1966
NJCAA athletics
Sugar Grove, Illinois
Two-year colleges in the United States